was a district located in Ōita Prefecture, Japan.

As of 2003, the district had an estimated population of 17,827 with a density of 40.98 persons per km2. The total area was 435.03 km2.

Towns and villages
Hon'yabakei
Sankō
Yabakei
Yamakuni

Mergers
On March 1, 2005 - the towns of Hon'yabakei, Yabakei and Yamakuni, and the village of Sankō were merged into the expanded city of Nakatsu. Shimoge District was dissolved as a result of this merger.

Former districts of Ōita Prefecture